Harold Burns (December 4, 1926 – March 24, 2013) was an American politician who represented the 1st district in the New Hampshire Senate from 2000 to 2002, and earlier in the New Hampshire House of Representatives.

Background
Born in Whitefield, New Hampshire, Burns served in the United States Army and owned an insurance business Burns Insurance Agency.

Political career
Burns served in the New Hampshire House of Representatives 1972-2000 and served as speaker from 1991 to 1996. He then served in the New Hampshire State Senate beginning in 2000 and retired in 2002. From 2005 to 2012 he was town moderator for Whitefield, New Hampshire.

Death
Burns died of cancer on March 24, 2013 at the age of 86 and is survived by two sons John and Scott both of Whitefield and a  daughter Sandra McCay of Hydesville, California, He was predeceased by his wife, Eleanor Ann Burns in 1997.

Legacy
 Burns Bridge in Whitefield was renamed in his honor in 2013.

Notes

1926 births
2013 deaths
People from Whitefield, New Hampshire
Speakers of the New Hampshire House of Representatives
Members of the New Hampshire House of Representatives
New Hampshire state senators